Carlow was a constituency representing the borough of Carlow in the Irish House of Commons, the lower house in the Irish Parliament of the Kingdom of Ireland. It returned two members to the Parliament of Ireland from 1613 to 1800.

History
The borough was incorporated in 1296 by Edward I and received further charters under the Stuart monarchs.

In the Patriot Parliament of 1689 summoned by James II, Carlow was represented by two members. Following the Acts of Union 1800 the borough retained one parliamentary seat in the United Kingdom House of Commons.

After the Acts of Union, its successor constituency returned one MP to the United Kingdom House of Commons from 1801 to 1885.

Members of Parliament, 1613–1801
1613–1615
Sir John Bere, Kt., Dublin, Serjeant-at-law,
Sir Robert Jacobe, Kt., Dublin (originally from Dorset), Solicitor General for Ireland
1634–1635
Barnabas O'Brien ("absent in England", replaced in January 1634, Edward Harman)
James Rawson, Dublin
1639–1649
Robert Hartpole of Shrule Castle, Queen's County (disqualified for Rebellion in June 1642)
Thomas Harman, Athy, Co. Kildare.
1661–1666
Sir John Temple, Palmerstown, Co. Dublin (Speaker)
Thomas Burdett, Garryhill, Co. Carlow.

1689–1801

Notes

References

Bibliography

Carlow, County Carlow
Constituencies of the Parliament of Ireland (pre-1801)
Historic constituencies in County Carlow
1613 establishments in Ireland
1800 disestablishments in Ireland
Constituencies established in 1613
Constituencies disestablished in 1800